Cycling was contested at the 1982 Asian Games in New Delhi, India.

Medalists

Road

Track

Medal table

References

External links 
 Last day track results

 
1982 Asian Games events
1982
Asian Games
Asian Games
Asian Games